Repton is a Defender-inspired game written by Dan Thompson and Andy Kaluzniacki for the Apple II and published by Sirius Software in 1983. It was ported to the Atari 8-bit family, and Commodore 64.

Gameplay
The player controls a fighter ship sent to stop a fleet of invading aliens from building an attack base on the planet Repton. The ship is equipped with lasers and a limited number of nukes that can destroy all enemies on the screen. The player can use an invulnerable shield for defense, but cannot steer or fire while it is up. If the player puts the shield up while moving, the ship will coast to a stop. In addition, a radar screen indicates the location of enemies on the planet surface.

Each level of the game is played in two parts. During the surface attack, the player fights enemies in order to delay the construction of the base. "Warning" messages indicate that a fresh wave of enemies is arriving, while an "Alert" tells of an attempt to siphon energy from the planet. If the player can fly through the enemy's energy beam in time, then pass through a charging station, the energy will be returned to the planet; otherwise, it will go into building the base.

Once the base is completed, the planet's defenses trigger a bomb that destroys the entire surface and the action shifts to the caverns, where the radar does not function. Here, the player must dodge enemy attacks and eventually destroy the base's power core, after which the next level begins with increased difficulty.

Reception
Softline in 1983 called Repton "the latest in ultra-fast action arcade games", praising its "faultless animation". Video reviewed the Apple II version of the game in its "Arcade Alley" column where it was described as "pure excitement from start to finish–an involving and satisfying battle game loaded with extra features to enhance gaming pleasure." Reviewers praised the game's "finely detailed graphics" and noted that "action is [its] hallmark". Ahoy! in 1984 gave Repton grades of B for graphics and C+ for gameplay. The magazine stated that the game "offered nothing new", and to only buy it if looking for "a definitive Defender-like shoot-em-up". Jerry Pournelle wrote in BYTE that despite disliking the Apple version of Repton, "I find myself wasting more time than I should on the Atari version".  The Commodore 64 Home Companion stated that the game had "excellent visuals". Repton received a Certificate of Merit in the "1984 Computer Game of the Year" category at the 5th annual Arkie Awards.

Legacy
In 2011, Kaluzniacki released a version of Repton for the iPhone. It uses high-resolution visuals instead of pixel art, which Jeff Minter criticized for losing the flavor of the original.

References

External links
 Repton at Atari Mania
 
 Repton tribute site

1983 video games
Apple II games
Atari 8-bit family games
Commodore 64 games
Horizontally scrolling shooters
Sirius Software games
Video games developed in the United States
Video games set on fictional planets